Connor Robert Marshall (born 28 January 1998) is a Welsh cricketer. He made his List A debut on 22 July 2021, for Derbyshire in the 2021 Royal London One-Day Cup, after signing for Derbyshire earlier in the month.

References

External links
 

1998 births
Living people
Welsh cricketers
Lincolnshire cricketers
Derbyshire cricketers
Cricketers from Cardiff